Taplinia is a genus of plants in the family Asteraceae.

There is only one known species, Taplinia saxatilis, endemic to Western Australia.

References

Gnaphalieae
Monotypic Asteraceae genera
Flora of Western Australia